New Garden Township is one of fifteen townships in Wayne County, Indiana, United States. As of the 2010 census, its population was 1,977 and it contained 794 housing units.

History
New Garden Township was organized in 1817. It was named by Quaker settlers after the New Garden Friends meeting house, in Guilford County, North Carolina.

Geography
The streams of Berg Brook, Fellow Brook, Fountain Creek, Garden Run, Gray Brook, Grove Creek, Knoll Run, Line Brook, Odd Run, Pole Creek, Quack Creek, Reel Run, Silver Brook, Slow Run, Willow Run, Woods Branch and Youngs Brook run through this township.

Cities and towns
 Fountain City

Adjacent townships
 Greensfork Township, Randolph County (northeast)
 Franklin Township (east)
 Wayne Township (south)
 Webster Township (southwest)
 Green Township (west)
 Washington Township, Randolph County (northwest)

Cemeteries
The township contains two cemeteries: Independent Order of Odd Fellows and Willow Grove.

Major highways
 U.S. Route 27

References
 U.S. Board on Geographic Names (GNIS)
 United States Census Bureau cartographic boundary files

External links
 Indiana Township Association
 United Township Association of Indiana

Townships in Wayne County, Indiana
Townships in Indiana